The second season of The Real Housewives of Orange County, an American reality television series, was broadcast on Bravo. It aired from January 16, 2007 until March 20, 2007, and was primarily filmed in Orange County, California. Its executive producers are Adam Karpel, Alex Baskin, Douglas Ross, Gregory Stewart, Scott Dunlop, Stephanie Boyriven and Andy Cohen.

The Real Housewives of Orange County focuses on the lives of Jo De La Rosa, Vicki Gunvalson, Jeana Keough, Lauri Waring and Tammy Knickerbocker. It consisted of 10 episodes, all of which aired on Tuesday evenings.

Production and crew

The season premiere "The Housewives are Back!" was aired on January 16, 2007, while the seventh episode "The Finale" served as the season finale, and was aired on March 13, 2007.
It was followed by a reunion special that aired on March 20, 2007, on Watch What Happens Live, which marked the conclusion of the season. Adam Karpel, Alex Baskin, Douglas Ross, Gregory Stewart, Scott Dunlop, Stephanie Boyriven and Andy Cohen are recognized as the series' executive producers; it is produced and distributed by Evolution Media.

Cast and synopsis
Four of the five housewives featured on the first season of The Real Housewives of Orange County returned for the second installment. Kimberly Bryant didn't return to the series as a cast member and officially departed the series during the first episode, after deciding to move to Chicago following a skin cancer scare. Season 2 saw the introduction of a new housewife, Tammy Knickerbocker, a divorced mother who tries to balance raising her daughters Megan and Lindsey with dealing with her ex-boyfriend Duff, who's interested in reconciling and dating. Tammy searches for a new place to live in the community after her house is severely damaged by a flood. Jeana spends most of her time focusing on being a Mother. Keough's son Shane is home-bound due to a back injury and his bad attitude gets on everyone's nerves. Keough encourages Colton, her youngest son's sporting endeavors and encourages her daughter to attend a good "networking" university. Keough continues to struggle in her marriage, often feeling like she is a single parent and feeling Matt's resistance. Vicki continues to focus of her work and family, but struggles to separate the two. Jo De La Rosa and Smiley had separated and reconciled on several occasions between production of the first and second seasons, during which period Smiley briefly dated Lauri Waring which in effect cause conflict between the two wives. Throughout the season De La Rosa is shown pursuing her interest in the music industry and Los Angeles. Waring's son, Josh, is away receiving treatment for his bad behavior, she meets the man of her dreams, George Peterson, who she later gets engaged to. Waring peruses a career away from Vicki's insurance company.

Episodes

References

External links

 
 
 

2007 American television seasons
Orange County (season 2)